Golem Grad, meaning Big City/Town, also known as Snake Island, is an island in North Macedonia. The island covers an area of more than 20 hectares. It is located in Lake Prespa, a few kilometers from the Greek and Albanian border. Golem Grad is home to several ancient ruins and churches. It is also home to several different communities of animals, especially snakes. In August 2008, the island opened to tourists.

Description

Golem Grad has an area of 20 hectares and is 600 meters long and 350 meters wide. The island is currently uninhabited and has been so since the mid-20th century, when the small monastic community left the island.
The island can only be reached by boat. The village of Konjsko is closest to the island with about two kilometers of water between the two.

See also
Lake Prespa
List of islands of North Macedonia
Maligrad

References

External links

Website about Golem Grad island

Islands of North Macedonia
Archaeological sites in North Macedonia
Resen Municipality
Lake islands of Europe